Michael Seelig is an Israeli Canadian architect and urban planner known for his contributions to urban public policy in Vancouver and for co-founding Bridges Restaurant, a Vancouver landmark.

Biography
Michael Seelig was born in Tel Aviv, Israel (then British Mandatory Palestine) in 1938, and grew up in Haifa. He received his Diploma in Architecture from Hammersmith College of Art and Building in London (1964) and his master's degree (1969) and PhD (1971) in City Planning from the University of Pennsylvania. Seelig worked as an architect for Al Mansfeld Architects in Haifa (1966); Yorke Rosenberg Mardall in London (1967); and Louis Kahn in Philadelphia (1968-9). He is currently Professor Emeritus at the University of British Columbia School of Community and Regional Planning where he taught from 1971 to 2000.

Urban planning
In 1972 Seelig, together with partners Frederick Gutheim and Arthur Erickson, established the planning firm Gutheim/Seelig/Erickson in Vancouver. The firm conducted a "Design Competition for the Urban Environment of Developing Countries Focused on Manila," which dealt with improving housing conditions for urban squatters. Seelig curated an exhibition of the results of the competition at the Vancouver Art Gallery in conjunction with Habitat, the United Nations Conference on Human Settlements in 1976, and published the results in The Architecture of Self-Help Communities.

Seelig co-authored a week-long series of articles on the future of Greater Vancouver for the Vancouver Sun entitled "Future Growth - Future Shock," which focused on accommodation of rapid growth, challenges of globalization, land use and transportation, and municipal and regional governance. The predictions made in this series continue to be discussed and critiqued.

As a city planner, Seelig has contributed frequently to national and local Canadian newspapers, radio and TV shows, and hosted a series of eight, one-hour TV programs, "Urban Change and Conflict," produced by the BBC and broadcast on Vancouver's Knowledge Network (1986-1990).

Bridges Restaurant
In 1980, Seelig co-founded Bridges Restaurant on Granville Island as part of Vancouver's conversion of a 14-hectare industrial peninsula into a culinary and arts destination. The restaurant contributed to the preservation of this industrial history by repurposing the 1940 Arrow Transfer warehouse building and dock and by maintaining the building's original, yellow façade, now considered an iconic part of the city. With the restaurant's expansive dock, Seelig introduced Vancouver to the concept of outdoor patio dining and the restaurant itself, prominently visible from both the Burrard Bridge and Granville Street Bridge, became a Vancouver landmark.

References

1938 births
Canadian urban planners
Canadian restaurateurs
Canadian architects
Israeli architects
Living people